McLean Stine "Mick" Abel (born August 18, 2001) is an American professional baseball pitcher in the Philadelphia Phillies organization. Abel was selected by the Phillies in the first round with the 15th overall pick of the 2020 Major League Baseball draft.

Amateur career
Abel grew up in Cedar Mill, Oregon, and helped lead the Cedar Mill Little League team win a state title as a youth. He graduated from Jesuit High School, where he was both a first baseman and a starting pitcher on the baseball team. Abel's sophomore season was cut short by an injury to his non-throwing shoulder that required surgery. As a junior Abel posted a 10–0 record with a 1.26 ERA and 111 strikeouts in  innings pitched while also batting .294 with 12 runs scored and 14 RBIs as he helped lead the Crusaders to a state championship and was named the Oregon Gatorade Player of the Year and a Junior All-American by MaxPreps. In 2019, he was selected for U-18 United States national baseball team. Entering his 2020 senior season Abel was named a preseason All-American by MaxPreps and Baseball America and was considered to be a top prospect for the upcoming draft. He was also ranked the fourth best collegiate prospect in the nation and committed to play at Oregon State University after his freshman year of high school.

Professional career
Abel was selected by the Philadelphia Phillies with the 15th overall selection in the 2020 Major League Baseball draft. Abel signed with the Phillies for a $4.075 million bonus. He did not play a minor league game in 2020 due to the cancellation of the minor league season caused by the COVID-19 pandemic.

Abel made his professional debut in 2021 with the Low-A Clearwater Threshers. Over 14 starts, he went 1-3 with a 4.43 ERA and 66 strikeouts over  innings. He missed time during the season due to a shoulder injury. Abel was assigned to the Jersey Shore BlueClaws of the High-A South Atlantic League at the beginning of the 2022 season. He went 7-8 with a 4.01 ERA and 103 strikeouts over 18 starts with Jersey Shore before being promoted to the Reading Fightin Phils of the Double-A Eastern League. In his Double-A debut on August 20, Abel allowed two runs and struck out eight batters in six innings to earn the win over the Portland Sea Dogs.

References

External links

Mick Albel USA Baseball profile
Perfect Game Profile

2001 births
Living people
Baseball pitchers
Baseball players from Portland, Oregon
Jesuit High School (Beaverton, Oregon) alumni
United States national baseball team players
Clearwater Threshers players
Jersey Shore BlueClaws players
Reading Fightin Phils players